Kåre Garnes (born 8 November 1954 in Bergen, Norway) is a Norwegian jazz musician (upright bass), known for his collaborations with Bergen jazz legends like Dag Arnesen, Knut Kristiansen, Per Jørgensen, Olav Dale and Ole Thomsen, and in a series of Norwegian jazz bands.

Career 
From the mid-1970s he was a central figure on the Bergen jazz scene, and participated such within orchestras like Knut Kristiansen/Per Jørgensen Quintet 1979–80, Ny Bris and Steam 1980–83. He moved to Oslo in 1983, and there he collaborated with musicians such as Odd Riisnæs, Bjarne Nerem, Laila Dalseth and Per Husby.

In 2010–12 he has performed a series of gigs at Oslo jazz clubs with his own K. G. Trio including Svein Christiansen (drums) and Håkon Storm-Mathisen (guitar), and in the quintet "Changes" including Tom Olstad, Nils Jansen and Rune Klakegg.

Discography 

With Dag Arnesen
1982: Ny Bris (Odin Records), including Frank Jakobsen, Olav Dale, Ole Thomsen and Per Jørgensen

With Eli Storbekken
1989: Glimt (Hot Club Records)

With Bjarne Nerem
1987: More Than You Know (Gemini Records)
1988: Mood Indigo (Gemini Records)
2006: Embraceable You (Gemini Records), compilation

With Odd Riisnæs
1988: Speak Low (Taurus Records)
1990: Thoughts (Taurus Records)

With Nora Brockstedt
1990: Hilsen Nora (Benoni Records)

With Knut Kristiansen
1995: Monk Moods (Odin Records)

With Totti Bergh
1996: Warm Valley (Gemini Records)

With Vidar Johansen Trio
1997: Lopsided (Curling Legs)

Trio including Harald Gundhus and Tom Olstad
1999: Don't Drop the Bop (Gemini Records)

With Tom Olstad
2007: Changes – For Mingus (Ponca Jazz)

References 

1954 births
Living people
Musicians from Bergen
Norwegian jazz upright-bassists
Male double-bassists
Jazz double-bassists
Norwegian jazz composers
Odin Records artists
Taurus Records artists
21st-century double-bassists
21st-century Norwegian male musicians